Wilson Antonio Cuero Llano (born 27 January 1992) is a Colombian footballer who plays for Spanish club CD Mensajero as a forward.

Career
Born in Cali, Valle del Cauca Department, Cuero graduated from Millonarios' youth setup. He made his professional debut on 15 February 2009, starting in a 1–1 home draw against Deportes Quindío.

On 24 July 2009 Cuero signed a deal with Udinese Calcio, being effective only in January of the following year. In April 2010 he joined Udinese's partner club Granada CF, being assigned to the reserves in the regional leagues.

In July 2011 Cuero was loaned to Cádiz CF, but appeared mainly with the B-team. On 31 August of the following year he moved to CD San Roque de Lepe also in a temporary deal.

Cuero returned to the Andalusians in June 2013, and renewed his link with the club on 9 October 2014. On 4 August of the following year he was loaned back to Cádiz, now to the main squad.

References

External links

1992 births
Living people
Footballers from Cali
Colombian footballers
Association football forwards
Categoría Primera A players
Millonarios F.C. players
Alianza Petrolera players
Segunda División B players
Tercera División players
Club Recreativo Granada players
Cádiz CF B players
Cádiz CF players
CD San Roque de Lepe footballers
Granada CF footballers
Real Murcia players
CF Lorca Deportiva players
Real Balompédica Linense footballers
Algeciras CF footballers
CF Villanovense players
CD Mensajero players
Venezuelan Primera División players
A.C.C.D. Mineros de Guayana players
Colombian expatriate footballers
Colombian expatriate sportspeople in Spain
Colombian expatriate sportspeople in Venezuela
Expatriate footballers in Spain
Expatriate footballers in Venezuela